The 1944 Atlantic hurricane season featured the first instance of upper-tropospheric observations from radiosonde – a telemetry device used to record weather data in the atmosphere – being incorporated into tropical cyclone track forecasting for a fully developed hurricane. The season officially began on June 15, 1944, and ended on November 15, 1944. These dates describe the period of each year when most tropical cyclones form in the Atlantic basin. The season's first cyclone developed on July 13, while the final system became an extratropical cyclone by November 13. The season was fairly active season, with 14 tropical storms, 8 hurricanes, and 3 major hurricanes. In real-time, forecasters at the Weather Bureau tracked eleven tropical storms, but later analysis uncovered evidence of three previously unclassified tropical storms.

The strongest storm of the season was the Great Atlantic hurricane, which struck Long Island and New England and later Atlantic Canada after becoming extratropical, causing about $100 million (1944 USD) in damage across the East Coast of the United States and Atlantic Canada, as well as at least 391 deaths, most of which occurred at sea. The Jamaica hurricane and Cuba–Florida hurricane were also powerful and left major impacts. The former inflicted "several millions of dollars" in damage in Jamaica, while 116 deaths were recorded throughout its path. The Cuba–Florida hurricane devastated both regions, resulting in at least 318 fatalities and damage exceeding $100 million. A hurricane which struck Mexico in late September caused between 200 and 300 deaths in the Isthmus of Tehuantepec due to flooding. Collectively, the tropical cyclones during the 1944 season caused about $202 million in damage and at least 1,025 fatalities.

Seasonal summary

The Atlantic hurricane season officially began on June 15 and ended on November 15. A total of 21 tropical cyclones developed. Fourteen of those cyclone intensified into tropical storms, the most since 1936, while eight of those reached hurricane status, the highest number since 1933. Three of those hurricanes intensified into major hurricanes. The season included the first instance of upper-atmosphere data via radiosonde being successfully incorporated into tropical cyclone track forecasting for a fully developed hurricane, which occurred as the Cuba–Florida hurricane approached Cuba. Collectively, the tropical cyclones of the 1944 Atlantic hurricane season caused approximately $202 million in damage and at least 1,025 fatalities.

Tropical cyclogenesis is believed to have begun with Hurricane One on July 13. Two other tropical cyclones formed in July. Four systems developed in August, two tropical depressions, a tropical storm, and a hurricane – the Jamaica hurricane. The month of September featured the most activity, which included a tropical depression, three tropical storms, and three hurricanes. During October, a subtropical depression, two tropical depressions, and two hurricanes developed. November featured a tropical storm and a subtropical depression, the latter of which was absorbed by a frontal system on November 14, marking the conclusion of cyclonic activity for the season.

The season's total activity was reflected with an accumulated cyclone energy (ACE) rating of 104, the highest total since 1935. ACE is a measure of the power of a tropical storm multiplied by the length of time it existed. Therefore, a storm with a longer duration will have high values of ACE. Thus, tropical depressions are not included here.

Systems

Hurricane One

A tropical wave was noted near Grenada on July 11; it organized into the season's first tropical depression two days later around 06:00 UTC while situated near Navidad Bank in the Turks and Caicos Islands. Upon designation, the Weather Bureau planned reconnaissance flights for the first time ever to fly into a newly formed cyclone. It intensified as it moved northwest, attaining tropical storm intensity by 00:00 UTC on July 14 and further strengthening into the season's first hurricane around 06:00 UTC on July 16. It transitioned into an extratropical cyclone around 00:00 UTC on July 19 and continued into the northern Atlantic, where it was absorbed by a larger extratropical low southeast of Newfoundland the next day.

Tropical Storm Two

A tropical wave organized into a tropical storm east of Barbados around 06:00 UTC on July 24, although it is possible the system existed farther east in the absence of widespread observations. Though it was initially believed the storm struck Haiti, where considerable damage was reported along the coastline near Port-au-Prince, and ultimately deteriorated, modern reanalysis suggests the cyclone continued south of the island. The system was then intercepted by strong wind shear that led to its dissipation west-southwest of Jamaica by 18:00 UTC on July 27. Its remnants continued westward and were last reported north of Honduras the following day.

Hurricane Three

The newly formed system intensified on a west-northwest course parallel to the Bahamas, attaining hurricane strength by 00:00 UTC on August 1.

Throughout Carolina Beach and Wrightsville Beach, an unusually high tide—combined with waves perhaps as large as —demolished several cottages and homes, or otherwise swept the structures off their foundations. The former city suffered a disastrous hit as its boardwalk was destroyed, while in Wrightsville Beach, local police estimated that the water reached  by its city hall. Two fishing piers were destroyed in each city. Crops sustained catastrophic loss throughout coastal beach counties. Damage reached $2 million. Though no fatalities occurred along the storm's path due to mass evacuations, there were a few people who suffered serious injuries.

Hurricane Four

The fourth cyclone of the season was first noted as a strong tropical storm east of Barbados around 18:00 UTC on August 16. The small storm passed over Grenada and into the eastern Caribbean Sea, where it quickly intensified into a hurricane. On a west-northwest course, the system organized into the season's first Category 3 major hurricane around 12:00 UTC on August 19, attaining peak winds of  six hours later. The hurricane grazed the northern coastline of Jamaica and continued westward while weakening slightly. The cyclone made a second landfall near Playa del Carmen on the Yucatán Peninsula with winds of  early on August 22. The cyclone entered the Bay of Campeche as a strong tropical storm weakened to sustained winds of  before moving ashore just north of Tecolutla, Veracruz. Then, it quickly dissipated by 12:00 UTC on August 24.

As the cyclone entered the Caribbean, it intercepted a British vessel which then went missing, with all 74 passengers aboard presumed dead. Across Jamaica, numerous buildings were heavily damaged, including light-frame dwellings that were blown down or crushed under fallen trees. Significant crop loss was observed, with 41% of coconut trees and 90% of banana trees destroyed; in some cases, every tree fell over in the coconut plantations. Two railway vans, each weighing 14.5 t (29,000 lbs), were overturned; as such, it was estimated that gusts reached  along the northeastern coastline. At least 30 people were killed across the island. In the Cayman Islands, wind gusts topped , though no damage was reported. Overall, the storm killed at least 116 people.

Tropical Storm Five

A tropical wave was first noted passing through the Windward Islands on August 13. The system moved ashore northeast of San Fernando, Tamaulipas, with slightly weaker winds of  before progressing inland and dissipating by 06:00 UTC on August 23. Little impact was noted from the cyclone, with an observation station in northeastern Nuevo León recording a wind gust of only . Rainfall in the Rio Grande Valley was mostly beneficial due to drought conditions.

Tropical Storm Six

On September 8, a weak area of low pressure developed along the tail-end of a stationary front across the northern Gulf of Mexico. The fledgling system moved north and then northeast, making its first landfall along the Mississippi River Delta with peak winds of  around 19:00 UTC on September 10. The system made its second landfall along Dauphin Island, Alabama, at 23:00 UTC at a slightly reduced intensity.

As the cyclone moved ashore, Mobile, Alabama, recorded its highest 24-hour rainfall total –  – since 1937. The streets of the city were inundated by flood waters, sustaining considerable damage alongside bridges. Pensacola, Florida, recorded sustained winds of  that resulted in about $500 worth of damage from damaged dwelling roofs.

Hurricane Seven

Already at tropical storm intensity, the system strengthened into a Category 1 hurricane about 24 hours later as it tracked west-northwestward. The storm intensified further, reaching major hurricane status early on September 12. Several hours later, the storm strengthened into a Category 5 hurricane on the modern-day Saffir–Simpson scale. The hurricane then curved north-northwestward on September 13. Early on September 14, the hurricane weakened to a to Category 3 intensity, several hours before passing just offshore North Carolina. The cyclone weakened further to a Category 2 prior to making landfall near East Hampton, New York, around 02:00 UTC on September 15 and near Charlestown, Rhode Island, about two hours later. The storm emerged into the Gulf of Maine and then transitioned into an extratropical cyclone near Mount Desert Island, Maine. The extratropical remnants continued east-northeastward across Atlantic Canada before dissipating over the far north Atlantic on September 16.

The cyclone produced hurricane-force winds along the East Coast of the United States from North Carolina to Massachusetts. Across the state, the hurricane damaged 316 homes and destroyed 28 others, while 351 buildings were damaged and 80 others were destroyed. Instead, the state likely experienced sustained winds up to Category 2 intensity. Throughout Virginia, 1,350 homes suffered some degree of damage, while 782 buildings were damaged and 31 others were demolished. In Maryland, the storm damaged 650 homes, while the cyclone also damaged 300 buildings and destroyed 15 others. The storm damaged about 1,800 homes and 850 buildings in Delaware. Throughout the state, the cyclone demolished 463 homes and 217 buildings, while damaging 3,066 other homes and 635 other buildings. A total 117 homes and 272 buildings were destroyed and 2,427 homes and 852 suffered some degree of structural impact. In Connecticut, the hurricane demolished 60 residences and 500 buildings, while causing damage to 5,136 dwellings and 4,550 other structures. Within the state, the cyclone wrecked 23 homes and 368 buildings and damaged 5,525 homes and 7,597 buildings. Massachusetts reported similar conditions, especially near the coast. The hurricane destroyed 230 homes and 158 buildings and inflicted some degree of damage to 3,898 homes and 915 buildings. Overall, the hurricane caused about $100 million in damage and 46 deaths on land in the United States. Additionally, at least 344 people were killed at sea due to maritime incidents relating to the storm. In Canada, the Atlantic provinces reported some wind damage to buildings, homes, and trees, as well as power outages. One person died in Nova Scotia due to electrocution.

Hurricane Eight

A tropical wave led to the formation of another tropical storm over the northwestern Caribbean Sea around 06:00 UTC on September 19. It moved northwest after formation while steadily intensifying, attaining hurricane strength by 00:00 UTC the next day. After moving inland, the cyclone weakened to a tropical storm and curved southwestward. The cyclone turned south over the mountainous terrain of Mexico, dissipating after 12:00 UTC on September 22.

At least two people drowned offshore Campeche, when a 100-ton (91,000 kg)-schooner sank. The hurricane produced torrential rainfall in the Isthmus of Tehuantepec region of Mexico, causing severe flooding. Between 200 and 300 people drowned, while survivors sought refuge in trees and atop roofs and boxcars. Aircraft and boats conducted search and rescue operations throughout the region. Floods also wrought extensive damage to the communication and transportation systems.

Hurricane Nine

The ninth storm of the season formed early on September 21, via a tropical wave that departed the western coast of Africa several days prior. The cyclone only slowly organized as it tracked west-northwest and then north, attaining hurricane strength early on September 24. After reaching its peak as a Category 2 hurricane with maximum sustained winds of  around 12:00 UTC the next day, an approaching cold front prompted the beginning of extratropical transition. The hurricane became extratropical on September 26, well south of Newfoundland. The post-tropical cyclone curved northeast over the far northern Atlantic and was last noted south of Iceland two days later.

Tropical Storm Ten

On September 28, a broad area of low pressure developed adjacent to a dissipating warm front over the north-central Atlantic. The cyclone congealed over the next two days and attained tropical storm status by 00:00 UTC on September 30, which was confirmed by a nearby ship report. It slowly intensified on a north and then northeast course, peaking with winds of  early on October 1. The system weakened to a tropical depression the following day and was subsequently absorbed by an approaching extratropical cyclone by 00:00 UTC on October 3.

Tropical Storm Eleven

The short-lived cyclone moved northwest and then north ahead of an approaching trough, acquiring peak winds of  shortly after formation before presumably dissipating on October 3. Alternatively, in the absence of widespread observations, the system may have continued into the central Atlantic unnoticed.

Hurricane Twelve

On the second week of October, a broad area of low pressure began to take shape along a frontal boundary across the northeastern Atlantic. The cyclone resumed its eastward motion shortly thereafter and weakened below hurricane strength, passing north of the Azores before transitioning into an extratropical cyclone early on October 15.

Hurricane Thirteen

On October 12, a disturbance in the western Caribbean Sea organized into a tropical depression near the Swan Islands. The system quickly strengthened as it drifted towards the north, becoming a hurricane the following day. After turning towards the west, it passed south of Grand Cayman and then resumed an accelerated northward motion near the 83rd meridian west between October 16–17. The storm weakened slowly over the Florida Peninsula, and the system eventually transitioned into an extratropical cyclone over South Carolina on October 20. The extratropical remnants moved northward, before merging with the Icelandic Low near Greenland.

The hurricane proved to be an important test of the American radiosonde network, whose upper-atmosphere data were successfully incorporated into tropical cyclone track forecasting, the first such instance on record. At least 300 people were killed in Cuba, though the full extent of casualties remains unknown as reports from rural areas of the island were never compiled. In Havana, numerous buildings were damaged. A weather station in Havana documented a  wind gust, which stood as the strongest gust measured in the country until Hurricane Gustav in 2008. Crops suffered extensively, exacerbated by the hurricane's timing near optimal harvest time. Total damage in the state amounted to $63 million, with about $50 million attributed to crop damage. Eighteen deaths were reported in the state and 24 others were hospitalized. Heavy rains and gusty winds were felt throughout the Eastern Seaboard from the hurricane and its extratropical remnants, causing widespread power outages. Overall, the hurricane caused more than $100 million in damage and at least 318 fatalities.

Tropical Storm Fourteen

Moving slowly southwestward, the depression attained tropical storm intensity six hours later and further intensified to attain peak winds of  early the next day. Because there were few ship and land observations; however, it is possible the storm became a hurricane, with historical precedence in Hurricane Martha. It then weakened, turned eastward, and dissipated on November 3 without moving ashore.

Tropical depressions
In addition to the fourteen tropical cyclones that reached at least tropical storm intensity, seven others did not strengthen beyond tropical depression status. The first such system developed just west of Bermuda on August 23. Moving rapidly northeastward, the depression would be absorbed by a frontal system near Nova Scotia two days later. Another depression developed from a tropical wave over the southeast Caribbean Sea near the Windward Islands on August 26. The depression moved westward and is believed to have dissipated quickly, though this might be due to a lack of observations. On September 18, a reconnaissance aircraft flight confirmed the development of a tropical depression over the northeastern Caribbean. The depression moved northwestward, crossing the Virgin Islands on the following day. After entering the open Atlantic north of the islands, the depression dissipated east of the Turks and Caicos Islands on September 21.

Weather maps and data indicate that a tropical depression formed just east of the Lesser Antilles on October 13. The depression entered the Caribbean and later crossed the Mona Passage, a strait between Hispaniola and Puerto Rico, on October 15. By the following day, the depression dissipated near the southeastern Bahamas. A frontal low-pressure area developed into a subtropical depression on October 20, far to the southwest of the Azores. The subtropical depression moved slowly northward and dissipated by the following day. On October 25, a tropical depression formed over the northwestern Caribbean. Dissipation likely occurred on the next day. The next cyclone, and the final system of the 1944 Atlantic hurricane season, developed from a frontal low east-northeast of Bermuda on November 13. A frontal system absorbed the subtropical depression on the following day.

Season effects
This is a table of all the storms that have formed in the 1944 Atlantic hurricane season. It includes their duration, names, landfall(s), denoted in parentheses, damage, and death totals. Deaths in parentheses are additional and indirect (an example of an indirect death would be a traffic accident), but were still related to that storm. Damage and deaths include totals while the storm was extratropical, a wave, or a low, and all the damage figures are in 1944 USD.

See also

List of tropical cyclones
Atlantic hurricane season
 1900–1950 South-West Indian Ocean cyclone seasons
 1940s Australian region cyclone seasons
 1940s South Pacific cyclone seasons

Notes

References

External links
1944 Monthly Weather Review

 
1944 meteorology
1944 natural disasters